Three Hills is a historic home located near Warm Springs, Bath County, Virginia.  It was built in 1913, and is a -story, frame and stucco Italian Renaissance style dwelling. It consists of a central block with flanking two-story wings and rear additions. The house has a Colonial Revival style interior. The front facade features a single-story, flat-roofed portico. Also on the property are the contributing small formal boxwood garden, three frame and stucco, one-story cottages, and a stone and brick freestanding chimney.  Three Hills was built by American novelist and women's rights advocate Mary Johnston (1870-1936), who lived and operated an inn there until her death. J. Ambler Johnston, a young architect, distant relative of the writer and one of the founding partners of the Carneal and Johnston architectural firm (recently merged with Ballou Justice Upton), designed the house.

Another home of Johnston's listed on the National Register of Historic Places is Linden Row in Richmond.

It was added to the National Register of Historic Places in 2013.

References

Additional Reading 
"Three Hills: The Home of Mary Johnston." Virginia Suffrage News, November 1, 1914. https://virginiachronicle.com/?a=d&d=VSN19141101&e=-------en-20--1--txt-txIN-------

Houses on the National Register of Historic Places in Virginia
Renaissance Revival architecture in Virginia
Colonial Revival architecture in Virginia
Houses completed in 1913
Houses in Bath County, Virginia
National Register of Historic Places in Bath County, Virginia
1913 establishments in Virginia